Gazumeh is a village in Banadkuk Rural District, Nir District, Taft County, Yazd Province, Iran. At the 2006 census, its population was 20, in 10 families.

References 

Populated places in Taft County